John A. McMahon (February 19, 1833 – March 8, 1923) was a three-term United States Representative from Ohio from 1875 to 1881. He was the nephew of Clement Vallandigham, another Representative from Ohio.

Biography 
McMahon was born in Frederick County, Maryland, and graduated from St. Xavier College in 1849. He taught at Xavier for a year, and settled in Dayton, Ohio, in 1852. He studied law with his uncle, Vallandigham, and was admitted to the bar in 1854, forming a partnership with his uncle. In 1861 he formed a partnership with George W. Houk, which lasted 19 years. He was elected to the Forty-fourth, Forty-fifth, and Forty-sixth United States Congresses, from 1875 until 1881.

McMahon was appointed by the House of Representatives as a manager to conduct impeachment proceedings against Secretary of War William W. Belknap. He was unsuccessful for re-election in 1880 and returned to private law practice in Dayton. He served as the president of the Ohio State Bar Association in 1886, and was a losing candidate for the Senate in 1889. He died in Dayton and was buried in Woodland Cemetery.

McMahon was married January 23, 1861, to Mollie R. Sprigg, of Cumberland, Maryland. They had a son, J. Sprigg McMahon, and daughter, Louise McMahon.

References

1833 births
1923 deaths
People from Frederick County, Maryland
Politicians from Dayton, Ohio
Burials at Woodland Cemetery and Arboretum
Xavier University alumni
Sprigg family
Democratic Party members of the United States House of Representatives from Ohio